The 11th constituency of the Nord is a French legislative constituency in the Nord département.

Description

Following the 2010 redistricting of French legislative constituencies La Bassée was removed from this constituency to be placed within Nord's 5th constituency and Lille-Sud-Ouest was added in its place.

Until 2017, the seat supported the Socialist Party and its predecessor SFIO at every election since 1958 with the sole exception of the conservative landslide of 1993. The Socialist Party regained the seat from LREM in 2022.

Historic Representation

Election results

2022

 
 
 
 
 
 
 
 
|-
| colspan="8" bgcolor="#E9E9E9"|
|-

2017

2012

 
 
 
 
 
 
|-
| colspan="8" bgcolor="#E9E9E9"|
|-

2007

 
 
 
 
 
 
|-
| colspan="8" bgcolor="#E9E9E9"|
|-

2002

 
 
 
 
 
 
 
|-
| colspan="8" bgcolor="#E9E9E9"|
|-

1997

 
 
 
 
 
 
 
|-
| colspan="8" bgcolor="#E9E9E9"|
|-

Sources
 Official results of French elections from 1998: 

11